is the sixth released single by the Japanese duo Tegomass.It was released on February 16, 2011. The single debuted at No. 1 on the Oricon weekly charts and certified Gold by the RIAJ. The song is a cover of Sasuke's 2004 single of the same name.

Single information
The single was released in two versions: a limited CD+DVD edition and a regular CD-only edition. The limited edition comes with an eight-page booklet, a 15-minute DVD containing the PV and making-of, and the original karaoke version of "Aoi Bench", while the regular edition comes with a double-sided four-page jacket, the acoustic version of "Aoi Bench", and "Sotsugyou Album". The title track was used as the ending theme for Onegai! Ranking during February 2011.

The song was a cover of the song of the same name by Sasuke.

Track listing

Limited Edition
 CD
 Aoi Bench
 Aoi Bench (Original Karaoke)
 DVD
 Aoi Bench (PV)
 Making of PV

Regular Edition
 Aoi Bench
 Aoi Bench (Acoustic Version)
 Sotsugyou Album

Charts and certifications

Charts

Sales and certifications

References

External links
"Aoi Bench" product information 

2004 songs
2004 singles
2011 singles
Tegomass songs
J Storm singles
Song articles with missing songwriters